Daniel Zuker (born c. 1964) is an American television writer and producer.

Biography
Born to a Jewish family, Zuker graduated from Syracuse University in 1986, where he was a member of the Psi Upsilon fraternity. He is best known for his Emmy Award winning work as an executive producer of ABC's Modern Family. Zuker has worked in various capacities, on a variety of TV shows, including Just Shoot Me, Grace Under Fire, and Roseanne. Zuker resides in Manhattan Beach, California with his wife and three children..

Zuker grew up in Livingston, New Jersey and graduated in 1982 from Livingston High School.

Per the broadcast on April 17, 2013, Zuker also started out as an intern on The Howard Stern Show.

In May 2012, Zuker gave the keynote address at the graduation convocation of his alma mater, the S. I. Newhouse School of Public Communications.

On April 15, 2019, Zuker joined a host of other writers in firing their agents as part of the WGA's stand against the ATA and the practice of packaging.

References

External links

 

American television writers
American male television writers
Television producers from California
Jewish American screenwriters
Living people
Place of birth missing (living people)
People from Manhattan Beach, California
People from Livingston, New Jersey
Livingston High School (New Jersey) alumni
S.I. Newhouse School of Public Communications alumni
1964 births
Screenwriters from California
Screenwriters from New Jersey
Television producers from New York (state)
Screenwriters from New York (state)
21st-century American Jews
Television producers from New Jersey
Psi Upsilon